Saviour Amunde Godwin (born 22 August 1996) is a Nigerian footballer who plays for the Portuguese side Casa Pia.

International career
He was selected by Nigeria for their 35-man provisional squad for the 2016 Summer Olympics.

Godwin made his debut for the Nigeria national football team on 27 September 2022 in a friendly game against  Algeria.

References

External links

1996 births
Sportspeople from Jos
Living people
Nigerian footballers
Nigeria youth international footballers
Nigeria under-20 international footballers
Nigeria international footballers
Association football midfielders
K.V. Oostende players
K.S.V. Roeselare players
Casa Pia A.C. players
Belgian Pro League players
Challenger Pro League players
Liga Portugal 2 players
Primeira Liga players
Nigerian expatriate footballers
Expatriate footballers in Belgium
Nigerian expatriate sportspeople in Belgium
Expatriate footballers in Portugal
Nigerian expatriate sportspeople in Portugal